Nabil Boutros Choueiri (born 1950) is a Lebanese former long-distance running athlete. He was the Lebanese record holder for over twenty years in the mile run, two miles, 3000 metres, and 3000 metres steeplechase.

Internationally, he was an Olympian at the 1980 Summer Olympics (running in the marathon) and ran at the IAAF World Cross Country Championships in 1979, 1981 and 1982. He was part of the Lebanese team for the 1979 Mediterranean Games.

References

External links

Living people
1950 births
Lebanese male marathon runners
Olympic athletes of Lebanon
Athletes (track and field) at the 1980 Summer Olympics
Lebanese steeplechase runners
Lebanese male long-distance runners
Lebanese male cross country runners
Competitors at the 1979 Mediterranean Games
Mediterranean Games competitors for Lebanon